The women's tournament of the 2017 Canadian U18 Curling Championships was held from April 18 to 22 at the Superior Propane Centre and Curl Moncton in Moncton, New Brunswick.

Teams
The teams are listed as follows:

Round-robin standings

Final round-robin standings

Round-robin results
All draw times are listed in Atlantic Time (UTC−04:00).

Pool A

Draw 1
Wednesday, April 18, 11:00 am

Draw 2
Wednesday, April 18, 3:00 pm

Draw 3
Wednesday, April 18, 7:00 pm

Draw 4
Thursday, April 19, 10:00 am

Draw 5
Thursday, April 19, 2:00 pm

Draw 6
Thursday, April 19, 6:00 pm

Draw 7
Friday, April 20, 10:00 am

Draw 8
Friday, April 20, 2:00 pm

Pool B

Draw 2
Wednesday, April 18, 3:00 pm

Draw 3
Wednesday, April 18, 7:00 pm

Draw 5
Thursday, April 19, 2:00 pm

Draw 6
Thursday, April 19, 6:00 pm

Draw 7
Friday, April 20, 10:00 am

Draw 8
Friday, April 20, 2:00 pm

Placement Round

Seeding Pool

Standings

Final Seeding Pool Standings

Seeding Pool Results

Draw 10
Saturday, April 21, 10:00 am

Draw 11
Saturday, April 21, 2:00 pm

Draw 12
Saturday, April 21, 6:00 pm

Championship Pool

Championship Pool Standings

Final Championship Pool Standings

Championship Pool Results

Draw 9
Friday, April 20, 7:00 pm

Draw 10
Saturday, April 21, 10:00 am

Draw 11
Saturday, April 21, 2:00 pm

Playoffs

Semifinals
Sunday, April 22, 1:00 pm

Bronze medal game
Sunday, April 22, 5:15 pm

Final
Sunday, April 22, 5:15 pm

Top 5 Player Percentages

References

External links
Official Website

U18 Championships
Canadian U18 Curling Championships, 2017
Canadian U18 Curling Championships
Canadian U18 Curling